Indotyphlops fletcheri is a species of worm snake. It is endemic to India.

References

 Wall,F. 1919 Notes on a collection of Snakes made in the Nilgiri Hills and the adjacent Wynaad. J Bombay Nat. Hist. Soc. 26: 552-584

Indotyphlops
Reptiles described in 1919